Dustin Brown and Lovro Zovko were the defending champions but they decided not to participate together this year.
Brown plays alongside Christopher Kas, while Zovko partners up with Marin Draganja, but both pairs lost in the first round.
Karol Beck and Rik de Voest won the title, defeating Rameez Junaid and Michael Kohlmann 6–3, 6–4 in the final.

Seeds

Draw

Draw

References
 Main Draw

Internazionali Tennis Val Gardena Sudtirol - Doubles
2012 Doubles